Isaiah 14 is the fourteenth chapter of the Book of Isaiah in the Hebrew Bible or the Old Testament of the Christian Bible. This book contains the prophecies attributed to the prophet Isaiah, and is one of the Books of the Prophets.

Text 
The original text was written in Hebrew language. This chapter is divided into 32 verses.

Textual witnesses
Some early manuscripts containing the text of this chapter in Hebrew are of the Masoretic Text tradition, which includes the Codex Cairensis (895), the Petersburg Codex of the Prophets (916), Aleppo Codex (10th century), Codex Leningradensis (1008).

Fragments containing parts of this chapter were found among the Dead Sea Scrolls (3rd century BCE or later):
 1QIsaa: complete
 4QIsac (4Q57): extant verses 1-5, 13
 4QIsal (4Q65): extant verses 1‑12, 21‑24
 4QIsao (4Q68): extant verses 28‑32

There is also a translation into Koine Greek known as the Septuagint, made in the last few centuries BCE. Extant ancient manuscripts of the Septuagint version include Codex Vaticanus (B; B; 4th century), Codex Sinaiticus (S; BHK: S; 4th century), Codex Alexandrinus (A; A; 5th century) and Codex Marchalianus (Q; Q; 6th century).

Parashot
The parashah sections listed here are based on the Aleppo Codex. Isaiah 14 is a part of the Prophecies about the Nations (Isaiah 13–23). {P}: open parashah; {S}: closed parashah.
 [{S} 13:6-22] 14:1-2 {S} 14:3-27 {P} 14:28-32 {P}

The restoration of Jacob (14:1–3)

Verse 1
For the Lord will have mercy on Jacob, and will yet choose Israel, and set them in their own land: and the strangers shall be joined with them, and they shall cleave to the house of Jacob.
"For": from the Hebrew word , ki, at the start of the verse as 'asseverative' ("certainly"), emphasizing the Lord’s desire to restore his people as one of the reasons for Babylon’s demise (Isaiah 13:22b).

Fall of the King of Babylon (14:4–21)
The song in verses 4b–21 could be secondarily applied to Sargon II, who died in 705 BCE and his body was never recovered from the battlefield. Here, Sargon ("King of Assyria" in Isaiah 20:1) is called the "King of Babylon" because from 710–707 BCE he ruled in Babylon and even reckoned his regnal year on this basis (as seen in Cyprus Stela, II. 21–22).

Verse 12

"How you are fallen from heaven,
O Lucifer, son of the morning!
How you are cut down to the ground,
You who weakened the nations!"
 "Fallen from heaven": see ,  for the words of Jesus Christ regarding the fall of Satan.
 "Lucifer" or "Day-star" (Hebrew: הילל hēylēl, from הלל hâlal, "to shine"). The Septuagint renders it, Ἑωσφόρος Heōsphoros, and Jerome in the Vulgate, "Lucifer, the morning star"; in the Chaldee, "How art thou fallen from high, who wert splendid among the sons of men." The New Oxford Annotated Bible suggests the correlation with "a Canaanite myth of the gods Helel and Shahar (Morning Star and Dawn), who fall from heaven as a result of rebellion."

Verse 19
But you are cast out of your grave
Like an abominable branch,
Like the garment of those who are slain,
Thrust through with a sword,
Who go down to the stones of the pit,
Like a corpse trodden underfoot.
"Abominable branch": "despised branch" or "like a shoot that is abhorred", where "branch" or "shoot" is from Hebrew word , netser (cf. Isaiah 11:1), here may refer to 'a small shoot that is trimmed from a plant and tossed away'.
"Thrust": "pierced"

Destruction of Babylon, Assyria and Philistia (14:22–32)

Verse 29

Do not rejoice, all you of Philistia,
Because the rod that struck you is broken;
For out of the serpent’s roots will come forth a viper,
And its offspring will be a fiery flying serpent.

See also
Assyria
Babylon
Jacob
Lebanon
Lucifer
Philistia
Zion
Related Bible parts: Isaiah 13, Isaiah 15, Luke 10, Revelation 22

References

Bibliography

External links 
 Jewish
 Isaiah 14 Hebrew with Parallel English

 Christian
Isaiah 14 English Translation with Parallel Latin Vulgate 

14
Lucifer